This is a list of mayors of Delémont in canton of Jura, Switzerland. The city of Delémont has a five-member executive (conseil communal) chaired by the mayor (maire).

References

Delemont
 
Delémont
Lists of mayors (complete 1900-2013)